Petrosaurus slevini, the banded rock lizard, is a species of lizard in the family Phrynosomatidae. It is endemic to the island of Angel de la Guarda and the adjacent islet of Mejía, in the Gulf of California off the east coast of the Baja California Peninsula in northwestern Mexico.

References

slevini
Lizards of North America
Fauna of Gulf of California islands
Endemic reptiles of Mexico
Endemic fauna of the Baja California Peninsula
Reptiles described in 1922
Taxa named by John Van Denburgh